The 1959 Oklahoma State Cowboys football team represented Oklahoma State University–Stillwater as an independent during the 1959 NCAA University Division football season. In their fifth season under head coach Cliff Speegle, the Cowboys compiled a 6–4 record and outscored opponents by a combined total of 181 to 161.

On offense, the 1959 team averaged 18.1 points scored, 195.2 rushing yards, and 118.5 passing yards per game.  On defense, the team allowed an average of 15.1 points scored, 195.2 rushing yards, and 83.1 passing yards per game The team's statistical leaders included Jim Dillard with 582 rushing yards, Dick Soergel with 1,100 passing yards, Bill Dodson with 286 receiving yards, and Tony Banfield with 66 points scored.

The team played its home games at Lewis Field in Stillwater, Oklahoma.

Schedule

After the season

The 1960 NFL Draft was held on November 30, 1959. The following Cowboys were selected.

References

Oklahoma State
Oklahoma State Cowboys football seasons
Oklahoma State Cowboys football